Roanoke Township is located in Woodford County, Illinois at T27N, R1W. As of the 2010 census, its population was 2,558 and it contained 1,044 housing units. Roanoke Township includes within its boundaries the village of Roanoke, Illinois.

Geography

Demographics

References

External links
City-data.com
Illinois State Archives

Townships in Woodford County, Illinois
Townships in Illinois